Robert Ellwood "Lefty" Uhl (September 17, 1913 – August 21, 1990) was a Major League Baseball pitcher who played for two seasons. He pitched in the Chicago White Sox for one game during the 1938 season and one game for the Detroit Tigers during the 1940 season.

External links

1913 births
1990 deaths
Chicago White Sox players
Detroit Tigers players
Baseball players from California
Major League Baseball pitchers